The siege of Philippsburg was a siege of the fortress of Philippsburg during the War of the League of Augsburg. It occurred between 27 September and 30 October 1688 and ended in a French victory over the Imperial garrison.

Bibliography
 

1688 in Europe
Battles of the Nine Years' War
Sieges involving France
Sieges involving the Holy Roman Empire
Conflicts in 1688
Battles in Baden-Württemberg